Otto Saly Binswanger (April 20, 1854 in Osterberg, Bavaria - September 25, 1917 in Portland, Oregon) was a German-American chemist and toxicologist.

Life
Born to the noted Binswanger family (named after the town Binswangen) and of German-Jewish descent, Otto Saly (Salomon) Binswanger was raised and schooled in Augsburg.

Apart from a one-year interruption for obligatory military service in 1873-74, Binswanger attended the Chemical/Technical Department of the newly founded Munich Polytechnic School as an auditor (not an enrolled student) between 1872 and 1876. In October 1876, he enrolled at the University of Erlangen, where he completed his Ph.D. dissertation on cresol and its derivatives under the direction of Eugen von Gorup Besanez in November 1877.

Binswanger emigrated to the U.S., where he enrolled at the University of Maryland in Baltimore. After three years of study, he completed a medical doctorate in May 1882.

Following his medical studies, Binswanger moved to Portland, Oregon, where he was a general practitioner.  In December 1883, he was appointed to a professorship in chemistry and toxicology at the Willamette University College of Medicine in Salem. In 1886, he and several colleagues relocated to the newly founded University of Oregon Medical School in Portland (now Oregon Health & Science University), where he taught until his death.

Dissertation

Ein Beitrag zur Kenntniss des Kresols und einiger Derivate. Inaugural-Dissertation zur Erlangung der Doctorwürde bei der hochlöblichen philosophischen Facultät der Universität Erlangen, eingereicht von Saly Binswanger aus Augsburg. Erlangen: Jacob, 1877. 21 pp.

Literature

Julian Hawthorne, The Story of Oregon. A History, with Portraits and Biographies. New York: American Historical Publishing Co., 1892, vol. 2, pp. 377f.

External links

Sara Piasecki, "First Gem from the Rough: Binsie". Historical Notes from OHSU (with portrait photo).

References

American toxicologists
German toxicologists
19th-century American chemists
20th-century American chemists
19th-century German chemists
Willamette University faculty
German emigrants to the United States
Jewish American scientists
1854 births
1917 deaths
Oregon Health & Science University faculty
Physicians from Portland, Oregon
University of Erlangen-Nuremberg alumni
University of Maryland, Baltimore alumni